The Swedish Kings is a Bulgarian comedy film released in 1968, directed by Lyudmil Kirkov, starring Kiril Gospodinov, Tsvetana Maneva, Asen Georgiev, Evstati Stratev and Konstantin Kotsev.

The construction worker Spas decides to go to a holiday at a luxurious seaside resort where he can amuse himself as a Swedish king. Soon he realizes that he is a stranger in this world of modern hotels and flashy night clubs full of snobs and insincere people.

The Swedish Kings is the first hit movie in the career of Lyudmil Kirkov. It became one of the classic works of the Bulgarian cinematography from the 1960s.

Cast
Kiril Gospodinov as Spas
Asen Georgiev as Blago 
Tsvetana Maneva as Blago's wife
Evstati Stratev as Goran
Konstantin Kotsev as Bozhko 
Hindo Kasimov as a taxi driver
Dolya Popova as Goran's wife
Gerasim Mladenov as a check-taker
Yoana Popova as Kalinka
Nikola Rudarov
Radoslav Stoilov
Mihail Botevski 
Stefan Mavrodiev
Dimitar Bochev

References

Sources

External links
 
 The Swedish Kings at the Bulgarian National Film Archive 
 The Swedish Kings at the Bulgarian National Television 

1960s Bulgarian-language films
1968 films
1968 comedy films
Bulgarian comedy films
Films set in Bulgaria
Films shot in Bulgaria
Fictional kings
Films about royalty